Bettancourt-la-Longue is a commune in the Marne department in northeastern France.

Geography
The village lies on the right bank of the Chée, which flows southwest through the southeastern part of the commune.

Population

See also
Communes of the Marne department

References

Communes of Marne (department)